Lee Hyun Jae (born December 20, 1929) is a former South Korean politician. He served from March to December 1988 as the 18th prime minister of South Korea. He is the chairman of the Ho-Am Prize Committee and an advisor of the Korean Association for Cultural Economics.

Notes

Prime Ministers of South Korea
Presidents of Seoul National University
Seoul National University alumni
1929 births
Living people
Members of the National Academy of Sciences of the Republic of Korea